Sirens is a two-part British television crime drama, broadcast on ITV on 13 and 14 October 2002. The serial stars Daniela Nardini as D.C. Jay Pearson, a detective within the serious crime group, tasked with investigating a serial rapist who is attacking lone young women in and around Islington. The serial received good reception, with 6.99 million viewers tuning in for episode 1, and 6.46 million tuning in for episode 2.

Production on the serial began in June 2001. A DVD of the serial was released on 3 October 2006 in the United States.

Cast
 Daniela Nardini as D.C. Jay Pearson, SCG detective
 Greg Wise as Oliver Rice, Ali's boyfriend and a main suspect in the case
 Robert Glenister as D.I. Clive Wilson, Jay's boss and nemesis
 Sarah Parish as Ali Pearson, Jay's sister and Oliver's girlfriend
 Anthony Calf as Anthony Soames, a patient of Rice's who also comes under suspicion
 Nisha Nayar as D.C. Kate Oakley, Jay's work partner
 Roger Griffiths as D.C. Steve Copley, a fellow SCG detective
 Alan Williams as D.C.I. Struther, head of department
 Ifan Meredith as D.C. Perry Collins, a fellow SCG detective

Critical reception
Andrew Anthony of The Guardian said the series "was unique in that it was worth watching — almost all the way up until its, inevitably, silly end. A sort of homage to modern American movies, that are in turn a homage to film noirs, it boasted a lush score, a sharp script, frisky camera work, sound acting and some imaginative locations. A little too imaginative in some cases."

Episodes

References

External links
.

2000s British drama television series
2002 British television series debuts
2002 British television series endings
2000s British crime television series
2000s British television miniseries
ITV television dramas
Television series by STV Studios
English-language television shows
Television shows set in London